Chu Jinling (楚金玲; born  29 July 1984 in Dalian) is a retired Chinese volleyball player. Chu currently plays club ball for Liaoning, and has played for the national team during many of its recent successes.

See also
China at the 2012 Summer Olympics#Volleyball
Volleyball at the 2012 Summer Olympics – Women's tournament

References 

1984 births
Volleyball players from Dalian
Living people
Asian Games medalists in volleyball
Volleyball players at the 2006 Asian Games
Olympic volleyball players of China
Volleyball players at the 2012 Summer Olympics
Chinese women's volleyball players
Asian Games gold medalists for China

Medalists at the 2006 Asian Games
21st-century Chinese women